is a 2016 Japanese jidaigeki adventure film directed by Hiroaki Matsuyama, starring Shun Oguri and based on the manga series of the same name by Ayumi Ishii. It was released in Japan by Toho on 23 January 2016.

Plot
Saburo (Shun Oguri) is a high school student good in sports, but not very good with his studies. One day, Saburo travels back in time and arrives in the Sengoku period of 1549. There, Saburo meets Nobunaga Oda who looks and sounds just like Saburo. Nobunaga Oda is the son of a warlord and magistrate of the lower Owari Province. Nobunaga Oda though is physically weak and he asks Saburo to take his place. Then, Saburo as Nobunaga Oda attempts to unify the country of Japan.

Cast
Shun Oguri as Saburō/Oda Nobunaga/Akechi Mitsuhide
Kō Shibasaki as Kichō
Osamu Mukai as Ikeda Tsuneoki
Takayuki Yamada as Hashiba Hideyoshi
Gaku Hamada as Tokugawa Ieyasu
Arata Furuta as Matsunaga Hisahide
Taisuke Fujigaya as Maeda Toshiie
Kiko Mizuhara as Oichi
Masahiro Takashima as Shibata Katsuie
Denden
Katsuya as Hachisuka Koroku

Takumi Kitamura

Reception

References

External links
 

Jidaigeki films
Japanese adventure films
2010s adventure films
Toho films
Nobunaga Concerto
Live-action films based on manga
2010s Japanese films
Cultural depictions of Oda Nobunaga
Cultural depictions of Toyotomi Hideyoshi
Cultural depictions of Tokugawa Ieyasu